The National Childcare Accreditation Council (NCAC) was a non-profit organization based in Sydney, Australia, in operation between 1993 and 2011. The Council was funded by and accountable to the Australian Government and was responsible for administering Child Care Quality Assurance (CCQA) for the following children's services in Australia:

 Family Day Care Quality Assurance (FDCQA) for family day care schemes
 Outside School Hours Care Quality Assurance (OSHCQA) for outside school hours care services
 Quality Improvement and Accreditation System (QIAS) for long day care centers 

In December 2009, the Council of Australian Governments (COAG) announced a National Partnership Agreement to a New Quality Agenda to replace the regulatory processes administered by state and territory governments and the Child Care Quality Assurance systems administered by NCAC from January 2012. The Council was superseded by the Australian Children’s Education & Care Quality Authority.

Child care quality assurance in Australia 
Child care quality assurance in Australia was first raised as a political issue in the lead up to the 1990 Federal election. The Crawford Committee was established in 1990 and recommended the then Minister for Aged, Family and Health Services establish a national body to represent all interest groups in children’s services to oversee the accreditation process.

This recommendation resulted in the formation of the Interim National Accreditation Council (INAC) in 1991. INAC presented a report to the Minister recommending accreditation be linked with receipt of Childcare Assistance.

NCAC was established in 1993 to develop an accreditation and quality assurance system for Australian child care services. Her Excellency MS Quentin Bryce, AC Governor-General of the Commonwealth of Australia was the founding Chair and CEO of NCAC between 1993 and 1996.  MS Denise Taylor was Chief Executive Officer of NCAC from 1997-2011.

Family day care schemes, outside school hours care services and long day care centers had to satisfactorily participate in the relevant CCQA system administered by NCAC in order to offer the Child Care Benefit as a fee reduction to parents and obtain funding support.

The CCQA systems provided a framework for reviewing, measuring and improving the quality of work done by approved child care providers. Services participating in CCQA progressed through a 5 step process including Registration, Self-study and Continuing Improvement, Validation, Moderation and Accreditation Decision.

While there are voluntary accreditation systems for children’s services in other countries,  the Australian CCQA system was linked to child care funding through legislation and to be funded and supported by the government.

Family Day Care Quality Assurance (FDCQA) 

The FDCQA system, administered in participating family day care schemes, outlined 30 principles of quality care which were incorporated into six quality areas:

 Interactions
 Physical environment
 Children’s experiences, learning and development
 Health, hygiene, nutrition, safety and wellbeing
 Carers and coordination unit staff
 Management and administration.

Outside School Hours Care Quality Assurance (OSHCQA) 

The OSHCQA system, administered in participating outside school hours care services, outlined 30 principles of quality care which are incorporated into eight quality areas:

 Respect for children
 Staff interactions and relationships with children
 Partnerships with families and community links
 Programming and evaluation
 Play and development
 Health, nutrition and wellbeing
 Protective care and safety
 Managing to support quality.

Quality Improvement and Accreditation System (QIAS) 

The QIAS, administered in participating long day care centers, outlined 33 principles of quality care which are incorporated into seven quality areas:

 Staff relationships with children and peers
 Partnerships with families
 Programming and evaluation
 Children’s experiences and learning
 Protective care and safety
 Health, nutrition and wellbeing
 Managing to support quality.

Summary of the landmarks in the Australian child care quality assurance journey

See also 
 Department of Education, Employment and Workplace Relations
 List of Australian Commonwealth Government entities

References

External links 
 National Archives of Australia - Archived resources and reports produced by NCAC are available from the National Library of Australia’s  Pandora website:
 https://webarchive.nla.gov.au/tep/102525
 Council of Australian Governments: http://www.coag.gov.au
 Department of Education, Employment and Workplace Relations: 
 Minister for School Education, Early Childhood and Youth: https://web.archive.org/web/20111024215835/http://www.petergarrett.com.au/
 Minister for Employment Participation and Childcare: http://www.kateellis.com.au
 National Childcare Accreditation Council: http://www.ncac.gov.au

Child-related organisations in Australia
Defunct Commonwealth Government agencies of Australia
Child care
Government agencies disestablished in 2011
2011 disestablishments in Australia